This list of U.S. counties with longest life expectancy includes 51 counties (and county equivalents) out of a grand total of 3,142 counties or county equivalents in the United States.  Most of the counties where people live longest are either sparsely populated or well-to-do suburbs of large cities.  Forty-seven of the counties listed have a population of which the largest racial component is non-Hispanic whites. Two have populations of which Hispanics are the majority. Asian Americans make up the largest component of two counties.

Counties with the longest life expectancy are located in 21 states:  Colorado (11); California and Iowa (5); Nebraska (4); North Dakota, Virginia, and Minnesota (3); Alaska, New York, and New Jersey (2), and Texas, New Mexico, Wyoming, Florida, Michigan, South Dakota, Idaho, Maryland, Utah, Wisconsin, and Oregon (one each).

The residents of three adjacent counties in the high-elevation Rocky Mountains of Colorado enjoy the longest life expectancy.

Among all the counties in the US there is a wide range in average life expectancy from birth. The residents of Summit County, Colorado, live the longest with an average life expectancy of 86.83 years.  The residents of Oglala Lakota County (formerly Shannon County) of South Dakota live the shortest with an average life expectancy of 66.81 years—twenty years less.  Moreover, the gap between the counties with the longest life expectancy and the shortest is widening.  The average life expectancy of the United States as a whole increased by more than 5 years between 1980 and 2014. The life expectancy of most of the longest-lived counties equaled or exceeded that increase.  The life expectancy of most of the shortest-lived counties increased less than 5 years—and in a few counties, especially in Kentucky, life expectancy decreased.

A study published in the Journal of the American Medical Association in 2016 concluded that income was a major component of the difference in life expectancy in states, counties, races, and regions of the U.S.. Men in the richest one percent of the population lived 15 years longer than men in the poorest one percent of the population and women in the richest one percent of the population lived 10 years longer.

Top 51 counties in 2014

See also
 List of U.S. states and territories by life expectancy
 List of U.S. counties with shortest life expectancy
 List of U.S. states by changes in life expectancy, 1985–2010
 List of U.S. congressional districts by life expectancy
 List of North American countries by life expectancy

References

Counties with longest life expectancy
Life expectancy, longest
Longest life expectancy, counties
United States